Jianming (建明) may refer to:

Jianming, Hebei, a town in Zunhua, Hebei, China.
Jianming (386), an era name used by Murong Yi, ruler of Western Yan
Jianming (530–531), an era name used by Yuan Ye, emperor of Northern Wei

See also
Jian Ming (1961–2019), Chinese poet